The 1926 Delaware Fightin' Blue Hens football team was an American football team that represented the University of Delaware in the 1926 college football season. In their second and final season under head coach Frank M. Forstburg, the Blue Hens compiled a 3–5 record and were outscored by a total of 122 to 41. The team played its home games at Frazer Field in Newark, Delaware.

Schedule

References

Delaware
Delaware Fightin' Blue Hens football seasons
Delaware Fightin' Blue Hens football